Darius is a live album by composer/bassist Graham Collier which was originally released on his own Mosaic label in 1974.

Reception

Allmusic said "This is easily the finest of Collier's early works; it breathes and moves and changes shape, tone, and intent, and comes off as a master work of balance between composition and improvisation". On All About Jazz Nic Jones noted "It might be argued that the six-piece band featured on both Darius and Midnight Blue is one of the best Collier has ever headed".

Track listing
All compositions by Graham Collier.
 "Darius" – 27:15
 "Darius (Conclusion)" – 16:30
 "A New Dawn" – 5:30

CD Track listing
All compositions by Graham Collier.
 "Darius part 1" – 9:39
 "Darius part 2" – 5:10
 "Darius part 3" – 20:19
 "Darius part 4" – 8:47
 "A New Dawn" – 5:35

Personnel
Graham Collier – bass
Harry Beckett – trumpet, flugelhorn
Derek Wadsworth – trombone
Ed Speight – guitar
Geoff Castle – electric piano
John Webb – drums

References

1974 live albums
Graham Collier live albums